Maraland is a region in the southeastern part of Mizoram state, India, referring not to a political or district name but specifically to the area inhabited by the Mara people. The region is one of the three Autonomous District Councils in the state. The Mara Autonomous District Council government is headed by Chief Executive Member, currently by Puhpa N. Zakhai, a veteran Congress politician.

Religion
All ethnic Maras are Christian, mostly evangelical. With the arrival of Reverend and Mrs. Reginald Arthur Lorrain in 1907 who had had earlier founded Lakher Pioneer Mission in Penge, South London in 1905, within a decade the Maras had accepted Christianity. Because the missionaries were from a congregational background, the newly founded church in Maraland was unaffiliated. The current Evangelical Church of Maraland, India and the Mara Evangelical Church, Myanmar were one before the partition of India.
Major religious denominations in Maraland include the Evangelical Church of Maraland (ECM), Congregational Church of India (Maraland), Lairam Isua Krista Baptist Kohhran (LIKBK), Salvation Army, Presbyterian Church of India, Baptist Church of Mizoram, United Pentecostal Church, Seventh Day Adventist, and Isua Krista Kohhran.

Facts and figures
Area: c.1,800 km²
Population: 56,574 (2011)
Sub-tribes:
Tlosaih
Hawthai
Zyhno: 
Chapi: 
Vytu:
Religion:
Christian: 100%
Capital: Siaha (population 25,000)

See also
Mara Thyutlia Py

External links
 Maraland information at Maraland.NET
Maraland.NET : The home of Mara people on the internet
Samaw.com : Maras first English Portal
Chakhei.com : Chakhei town online site
Maraland.org

Mizoram